Yagantipalle is a village in Kurnool district, Andhra Pradesh, India.

Villages in Kurnool district